Umpithamu, also spelt Umbindhamu, is an Australian Aboriginal language of the Cape York Peninsula, Queensland, Australia. 

In July 2020, A Dictionary of Umpithamu was published, compiled by Flemish linguist Jean-Christophe Verstraete, with main language consultants Florrie Bassani and her niece Joan Liddy.

Classification
Though generally accepted as a branch of the Paman languages, Dixon believes it to be an isolate. According to Rigsby (1997), Umpithamu shares some grammatical features with the other languages spoken by the Lamalama people, but it shares more lexicon with Ayapathu and Umpila.

In 2008, Verstraete wrote that there were four languages associated with the Lamalama people: Umpithamu, Morrobolam, Mba Rumbathama (Mbarrumbathama, Lamalama) and Rimanggudinhma language (Mbariman-Gudhinma). In 2020, he spoke of five languages associated with the Lamalama people, but the name of the fifth is not recorded in the article.

He is quoted by Austlang from his 2018 work, The Genetic Status of Lamalamic, that Lamalama, Rimanggudinhma and Morrobolam form a genetic subgroup of Paman known as Lamalamic, "defined by shared innovations in phonology and morphology". 

"Yintjinggu/Jintjingga" is a place name used for both Umpithamu and the neighbouring Ayabadhu language.

References 

Paman languages
Extinct languages of Queensland